The Hartshill Formation is a geologic formation in England. It preserves fossils dating back to the Cambrian period.

See also

 List of fossiliferous stratigraphic units in England

References
 

Cambrian System of Europe
Cambrian England
Cambrian south paleopolar deposits